The Bavarian pine vole (Microtus bavaricus) is a vole from the Austrian, Italian, and Bavarian Alps of Europe. It lives in moist meadows at elevations of 600 to 1,000 meters.

Conservation
There are 23 museum specimens of this species; it was previously known to live in only one location, Garmisch-Partenkirchen in Bavaria, which was altered by the construction of a hospital in the 1980s. No specimens of this rodent were recorded after 1962 and it was thought to be extinct. However, a population apparently belonging to this species was discovered in 2000 in Northern Tyrol, just across the German-Austrian border. An Austrian scientist, Friederike Spitzenberger, stumbled upon the species in a live trap. Its species status was confirmed by genetic studies, and it was found to be very closely related to Liechtenstein's vole (Microtus liechtensteini) from the Eastern Alps. Further research is required to determine the size and range of the population and the species has been re-assessed as Critically Endangered by the IUCN.

See also 
 Lazarus taxon

References

  Database entry includes justification for why this species is listed as critically endangered.
 'A Gap in Nature' by Tim Flannery and Peter Schouten (2001), published by William Heinemann
Musser, G. G. and M. D. Carleton. 2005. Superfamily Muroidea. pp. 894–1531 in Mammal Species of the World: A Taxonomic and Geographic Reference. D. E. Wilson and D. M. Reeder eds. Johns Hopkins University Press, Baltimore.
 The Extinction Website, published by Peter Maas
 IUCN Red List of Threatened Species: Microtus bavaricus

Microtus
Vole, Bavarian pine
Endemic fauna of Austria
Critically endangered animals
Critically endangered biota of Europe
Mammals described in 1962